The 1976 Cal Poly Pomona Broncos football team represented California State Polytechnic University, Pomona as a member of the California Collegiate Athletic Association (CCAA) during the 1976 NCAA Division II football season. Led by Andy Vinci in his third and final season as head coach, Cal Poly Pomona finished the season with an overall record of 3–6–1 with a mark of 1–1 in conference play, placing second in the CCAA. The team was outscored by its opponents 199 to 135 for the season. The Broncos played home games at Kellogg Field in Pomona, California.

Mississippi State was later required to forfeit all nine of their victories in the 1976 season, including their win over Cal Poly Pomona on October 2. With the forfeit, Cal Poly Pomona's overall record in 1976 improved to 4–5–1.

Schedule

References

Cal Poly Pomona
Cal Poly Pomona Broncos football seasons
Cal Poly Pomona Broncos football